ONVIF (the Open Network Video Interface Forum) is a global and open industry forum with the goal of facilitating the development and use of a global open standard for the interface of physical IP-based security products. ONVIF creates a standard for how IP products within video surveillance and other physical security areas can communicate with each other. ONVIF is an organization started in 2008 by Axis Communications, Bosch Security Systems and Sony.

It was officially incorporated as a non-profit, 501(c)6 Delaware corporation on November 25, 2008. ONVIF membership is open to manufacturers, software developers, consultants, system integrators, end users and other interest groups that wish to participate in the activities of ONVIF. The ONVIF specification aims to achieve interoperability between network video products regardless of manufacturer.

ONVIF concerns itself with standardization of communication between IP-based physical security products to achieve open interoperability between equipment from different manufacturers.

Members

In December 2009, the ONVIF member base had grown to 103 members. This comprised 12 full members, 13 contributing members and 78 user members. In December 2010, the forum had more than 240 members and more than 440 conformant products on the market. By January 2015, this had grown to more than 3,700 ONVIF conformant products and 500 members. By August 2016, this had grown to more than 6,900 conformant products on the market but shrunk to  461 members. In February 2020, ONVIF reached more than 14,000 conformant products. , there are 496 members and more than 23000 conformant products.

Name
ONVIF originally was an acronym for Open Network Video Interface Forum. The longer name was dropped as the scope of the standard expanded beyond video applications.

Specification
The ONVIF Core Specification aims to standardize the network interface (on the network layer) of network video products. It defines a network video communication framework based on relevant IETF and Web Services standards including security and IP configuration requirements. The following areas are covered by the Core Specification version 1.0:
 IP configuration
 Device discovery
 Device management
 Media configuration
 Real-time viewing
 Event handling
 PTZ camera control
 Video analytics
 Security

ONVIF utilizes IT industry technologies including SOAP, RTP, and Motion JPEG, MPEG-4, H.264 video codecs and H.265 video codecs. Later releases of the ONVIF specification (version 2.0) also cover storage and additional aspects of analytics.

Milestones
 November 25, 2008: Incorporated as Open Network Video Interface Forum
 November 2008: Release of Core Specification version 1.0
 December 2008: Release of Test Specification version 1.0
 December 2008: First member meeting in Washington, DC
 March 2009: Set up of several working groups to work on the further development of the forum
 May 2009: Release of test tool and conformance process
 July 2009: Release of the world's first ONVIF conformant products by Merit Lilin
 September 2009: Show plug fest in Los Angeles, USA
 October 2009: ONVIF reaches 100 members
 April 2010: ONVIF extends the scope to cover access control in addition to video
 July 2010: ONVIF reaches 200 members
 November 2010: Release of Core specification version 2.0
 December 2010: Release of Test Specification version 1.02.2
 January 2011: 600 ONVIF-conformant products on the market
 December 2011: Test Specification version 11.12 released
 January 2012: Profile S specification released to clarify interoperability
 June 2012: Test Specification version 12.06 released
 December 2012: Test Specification version 12.12 released
 June 2013: Test Specification version 13.06 released
 August 2013: Release of Core specification version 2.4
 December 2013: Test Specification version 13.12 released
 December 2013: Profile C Specification released
 March 2014: Final release of Profile C
 June 2014: Test Specification version 14.06 released
 June 2014: Profile G Specification released
 December 2014: Profile Q Specification released
 December 2014: Release of Core specification version 2.5
June 2015: Release of Core specification version 2.6
December 2015: Release of Core specification version 2.61
June 2016: Release of Core specification version 16.06
December 2016: Release of Core specification version 16.12
June 2017: Release of Core specification version 17.06
December 2017: Release of Core specification version 17.12
June 2018: Release of Core specification version 18.06
December 2018: Release of Core specification version 18.12
June 2019: Release of Core specification version 19.06
December 2019: Release of Core specification version 19.12
June 2020: Release of Core specification version 20.06
December 2020: Release of Core specification version 20.12
June 2021: Release of Core specification version 21.06
July 2021: Ends support for Profile Q

See also
 Physical Security Interoperability Alliance
 Dashcam

References

External links
 Official ONVIF website
 ONVIF Member List

Video surveillance
Standards organizations in the United States
Network protocols
Physical security